St. Gangolf's Church is a Roman Catholic church in Trier, Germany. It is dedicated to St. Gangulphus. After Trier Cathedral, it is the second oldest church building in the city.

External links 

Roman Catholic churches in Trier